Maggie Millar (born 6 January 1941) alternatively Maggie Miller, is an Australian former actress, artist, writer, radio personality and public relations officer. She is known for her television series roles in Bellbird, The Sullivans and Prisoner (1976, 1981-84).

Millar came out of retirement when she was offered a part in Neighbours in 2002. After a year she was written out of the series and again retired in 2007, except for a brief return in a short film in 2016.

Biography

Career
Millar was born in Sydney, Australia and trained in London, England at the Royal Academy of Dramatic Art, having won a scholarship to go there. Although she has appeared in pantomime and other theatre, she is best known for her many Australian television appearances. She won the 1976 Logie Award for Best Individual Performance by an Actress for Homicide, and she is best known for appearances in soap opera in shows such as Hunter, Division 4, Matlock Police, Cop Shop, A Country Practice and Blue Heelers.  
  
Millar is best known for her long term roles in series including Bellbird as Georgia Moorhouse, Prisoner as Marie Winter,The Sullivans as Elizabeth Bradley and Neighbours as Rev. Rosie Hoyland.

She has appeared on ABC Radio and many Australian films, mainly in cameo roles including Phar Lap and Peita.

She is an award-winning artist, specializing in oil and acrylic painting.

Personal life
Millar has been married twice. Her first husband was from Germany, and together they had a son, Benjamin. Following their divorce in 1976, Millar met theatre critic—turned—primary school teacher, Ian, and they married in 1984.

Filmography

Film

Television

References

External links

1941 births
Alumni of RADA
Australian film actresses
Australian soap opera actresses
Australian stage actresses
Living people
Logie Award winners
20th-century Australian actresses
21st-century Australian actresses